Therottam is a 1971 Indian Tamil-language film produced and directed by V. T. Arasu. The film stars Gemini Ganesan, Padmini and Cho Ramaswamy.

Plot

Cast 
 Gemini Ganesan
 Padmini
 Cho Ramaswamy

Soundtrack 
The soundtrack was composed by S. M. Subbaiah Naidu.

Release and reception 
Therottam was released on 16 July 1971. A writer of Film Word praised Cho's performance as a Tamil speaking Andhra Pradesh lawyer, calling it one of the "very few outstanding performances" of that year, and said there were some "good early scenes" between Ganesan and Padmini.

References

External links 
 

1970s Tamil-language films
1971 drama films
Films scored by S. M. Subbaiah Naidu
Indian drama films